The siege of Baidoa (July 2008 – January 2009) was a military confrontation in which the Al-Shabaab militia laid siege to the headquarters of the Somali Transitional Federal Government (TFG).

Timeline 
On July 8, al-Shabaab launched a midnight attack on Baidoa's presidential palace, airport and parliament with rockets and mortars, killing 11 soldiers in the encircled and vulnerable de facto capital of the Transitional Government. Baidoa Airport is the lifeline for the city. In the tense situation, Baidoa police opened fire on a bus that refused to stop for them, killing many on board. TFG police are known to extort money from travelers at roadblocks, and this is likely an unrelated incident.

On July 9, Islamists seized a large shipment of Ethiopian arms and military vehicles from an armored convoy heading from Balidogle Airport to Baidoa meant for the TFG military. 3 Islamists were killed in the battle, as well as one confirmed government soldier dead. The convoy was attacked a second time in Wanla Weyne before finally reaching Baidoa.

On July 10, Islamists seized the control of Deynunay town 20 km south of Baidoa city the seat of Somalia parliament, killing one government soldier, a spokesman said.

Fierce fighting near Daynunay continued for a second day on July 11 as Islamist and TFG forces battled, 3 TFG soldiers were killed in the battle.

On July 13, al-Shabab forces reoccupied Bardhere and Burhakaba, or more appropriately al-Shabab forces mustered in these two towns en route to Baidoa, as TFG presence in these towns had long since been expelled.

The United Nations Development Program (UNDP), an organisation with many years of experience in Somalia, withdrew from Baidoa due to the imminent attack.

On August 27, a bombing attack in the city left the son of a Somali MP dead along with one of his bodyguards.

On September 5, Islamist fighters attacked an Ethiopian Army convoy that just left the city in the town of Bardale, 55 kilometers southwest of Baidoa. Two Ethiopian soldiers, two insurgents and one civilian were killed in the attack and one Ethiopian Army truck was burned. Two days later on September 7, insurgents attacked a police station in the city but there were no casualties.

On September 20, heavy fighting between Somali government troops and the insurgents killed at least two soldiers, three insurgents and one civilian in the city when a government checkpoint was attacked.

On October 2, three separate insurgent attacks in the town killed two civilians and one soldier.

On October 13, more heavy fighting resulted in the deaths of four insurgents and two Ethiopian soldiers after an Ethiopian Army convoy, heading into Baidoa, was ambushed.

On December 24, a landmine killed three policemen in the city.

On January 26, 2009, the city finally fell. Islamist forces took Baidoa, which was by this point the last major city controlled by the Transitional Government. This came after Ethiopian troops completely pulled out of the country only a day before. Pro-Government (or rather anti-Islamist) forces remained in control of a corridor of territory along the border with Ethiopia, and most of Gedo and Bakool. Member of parliament Mohamed Ibrahim Habsade and his troops, along with 10 other MP's, surrendered to Islamist forces as they entered the town. During the takeover government troops and militiamen attempted to resist, in fighting that left five civilians and four soldiers dead, but were not able to stop the insurgents advance.

References 

2008 in Somalia
Baidoa
Baidoa
Baidoa
2008 crimes in Somalia